Coglès (pronounced as Cogles; , north) is a former commune in the Ille-et-Vilaine department of Brittany in northwestern France. On 1 January 2017, it was merged into the new commune Les Portes du Coglais.

Population

See also
Communes of the Ille-et-Vilaine department

References

External links

Former communes of Ille-et-Vilaine